The Agricultural Industry Electronics Foundation (AEF) is an international partnership between implement manufacturers and tractor manufacturers within the agricultural industry. 

The AEF was founded in 2008 by John Deere, CNH, Claas, AGCO, Kverneland Group, Grimme and Pöttinger. The goal of this partnership is to promote the electronic standardization and assure that ISOBUS-implements and tractors from different brands can be connected without any problems. In the AEF seven project groups are active to realise the standardization within the agricultural industry and to solve any problems together. Worldwide more than hundred companies active in the implement and tractor industry have joined the AEF.

External links 
 
 AEF ISOBUS Database
 http://www.clubofbologna.org/ew/documents/1.3_Van_der_Vlugt.pdf

International agricultural organizations
Agricultural technology